PNS Khaibar may refer to following ships of Pakistan Navy:

 , the former British  HMS Cadiz (D79) acquired by Pakistan in 1956 and sunk in the Indo-Pakistan War of 1971.
 , the former United States  USS Brooke (FFG-1) acquired by Pakistan in 1989 and returned in 1993. She was scrapped in 1994.
 , the former British Type 21 frigate HMS Arrow (F173) acquired by Pakistan in 1994.

Pakistan Navy ship names